Yankin Education College (In Burmese ; ရန်ကင်းပညာရေးကောလိပ်) is an educational college located in Yankin Township, Kanbe', Yangon Region, Burma. It teaches basic and essential role of teacher for two years which produces primary & secondary teachers yearly. Later on, precisely, in 2003, it launched new training program for fresh graduate called COBOL.

First established as STCT on 01.08.1947

Upgraded to EC on 27.11.1998

Location - No.4, Thitsar Road, 11ward, Yankin Township

Campus Area - 15.308 Acres

References

Universities and colleges in Yangon
Universities and colleges in Myanmar